Arne Engels (born 8 September 2003) is a Belgian professional footballer who plays as a midfielder for  club FC Augsburg.

Career

Club NXT
Engels began his career at the youth academy of Club Brugge. On 22 August 2020, Engels made his debut for Brugge's reserve side, Club NXT in the Belgian First Division B against RWDM47. He was a starter as NXT lost 2–0.

Augsburg
On 3 January 2023, Engels signed for Bundesliga club FC Augsburg on a four-and-a-half year contract.

Career statistics

References

External links
Profile at the UEFA website
Belgium profile at Belgian FA

2003 births
Living people
Belgian footballers
Association football midfielders
Club NXT players
FC Augsburg players
Challenger Pro League players
Bundesliga players
Belgian expatriate footballers
Expatriate footballers in Germany
Belgian expatriate sportspeople in Germany